WFQX (99.3 MHz) is a classic rock formatted broadcast radio station licensed to Front Royal, Virginia, serving the Northern Shenandoah Valley.  WFQX is owned and operated by iHeartCommunications, Inc.

References

External links
 99-3 The Fox Online
 

1973 establishments in Virginia
Classic rock radio stations in the United States
Radio stations established in 1973
FQX
IHeartMedia radio stations